Lindsey Ann Petrosh (born January 14, 1989) is an American beauty pageant titleholder from Egg Harbor City, New Jersey who was named Miss New Jersey 2012.

Early life and education

Petrosh was born in Egg Harbor City, New Jersey. She graduated in 2007 from Saint Joseph High School. She received bachelor's and master's degrees from Rowan University.

Pageant career
Petrosh participated in her first pageant at age 16. At age 17, she won the title of Miss New Jersey's Outstanding Teen in 2006. She subsequently competed in the Miss America's Outstanding Teen pageant in 2007.

Petrosh won the title of Miss New Jersey on June 16, 2012. It was her second attempt at the crown; she had also competed in 2010. Her competition talent was a vocal performance of “The Battle Hymn of the Republic.”

References

External links

 

1989 births
American beauty pageant winners
Living people
Miss America 2013 delegates
People from Egg Harbor City, New Jersey
Rowan University alumni